The 2015 All-Ireland Senior Camogie Championship—known as the Liberty Insurance All-Ireland Senior Camogie Championship for sponsorship reasons— is the premier competition of the 2015 camogie season. Ten county teams compete in the Senior Championship out of twenty-seven who compete overall in the Senior, Intermediate and Junior Championships. It commenced on 20 June.

Format
The ten teams are drawn into two groups of five teams. All the teams play each other once, scoring two points for a win and one for a draw.

In the two quarter-finals, 2nd in  Group A plays 3rd in Group B and 3rd in Group A plays 2nd inGroup B..

The two group winners and the two quarter-final winners play in the semi-finals.

The semi-final winners contest the 2015 All-Ireland Senior Camogie Championship Final

Fixtures and results

Group stages

Group 1

Group 2

As stated in the rules, it was originally planned that a coin toss would take place to decide which of Dublin and Clare would progress to the quarter-finals. The head-to-head match between them had ended in a 1-8 to 1-8 draw and competition rules meant that they were level in the group. Both teams withdrew in protest at the proposed coin toss and eventually the Camogie Association decided that a play-off match would take place instead.

Knock-Out Stages

Quarter-finals

Semi-finals

All-Ireland final

References

External links
 Camogie Association

2015
2015
All-Ireland Senior Camogie Championship